Emet is an unincorporated community in Johnston County, Oklahoma, United States. A post office operated in Emet from 1884 to 1917. The Chickasaw have dwelt in Johnston County since the 1830s, and Emet's history reflects its Chickasaw heritage.  Pleasant Grove Mission School, which was established by the Methodist Episcopal Church in 1844 and served Chickasaw Nation, was located near Emet. Chickasaw actress and storyteller Te Ata Fisher was born in Emet in 1895.

Douglas H. Johnston, the last governor of the Chickasaw Nation, lived in Emet. His home, known as the "Chickasaw White House," still stands in Emet, and is now a museum.

Demographics

References

Unincorporated communities in Johnston County, Oklahoma
Unincorporated communities in Oklahoma